Zachariah Joseph "Zack" Novak (born May 27, 1990) is an American former professional basketball player. He played four years of college basketball for Michigan before playing one season of professional basketball in the Netherlands.

Professional career
During his senior season for the 2011–12 Michigan Wolverines, the team earned a share of the 2011–12 Big Ten Conference season regular season championship. On July 23, 2012, Novak signed with Dutch team Landstede Basketbal for the 2012–13 season. He helped Landstede reach the final of the Dutch Cup and earned DBL All-Star honors and All-DBL Team recognition. In 38 games, he averaged 17.8 points, 4.8 rebounds, 1.6 assists and 1.4 steals per game.

Post-playing career
In December 2013, Novak moved to Chicago, where he caught on with a predictive analytics software company, Uptake. He also runs the Zack Novak Dexter Shooting Academy.

References

External links

Zack Novak at basketballleague.nl
Zack Novak at mgoblue.com

1990 births
Living people
American expatriate basketball people in the Netherlands
Basketball players from Indiana
Dutch Basketball League players
Landstede Hammers players
Michigan Wolverines men's basketball players
People from Chesterton, Indiana
Ross School of Business alumni
Shooting guards
Sportspeople from Hammond, Indiana
American men's basketball players